Einion ap Cunedda ( – 500;;   – 480s), also known as Einion Yrth (Welsh for "the Impetuous"), was a king of Gwynedd. He is claimed as an ancestor of the later rulers of North Wales.

One of the sons of Cunedda, he travelled with his father to north Wales in the early 450s to expel Irish raiders from the region. After his father's death, Einion inherited control over the newly founded kingdom of Gwynedd. Aided by his brother Ceredig, ruler of Ceredigion, and his nephew  Meirion, ruler of Meirionnydd, Einion built upon his father's successes and further established his family's rule in the region. He was succeeded by two sons: Cadwallon Lawhir and Owain Ddantgwyn.

See also
Kings of Wales family trees

References

420s births
500s deaths
British traditional history
Monarchs of Gwynedd
5th-century Welsh monarchs